Julián Andrés Kmet (born 21 November 1977) is an Argentine retired footballer who played as a midfielder.

He amassed Argentine Primera División totals of 190 games and 22 goals over 11 seasons, representing mainly Lanús.

Club career
Born in Lanús, Buenos Aires Province of Ukrainian descent, Kmet scored a career-best ten goals in 36 Primera División games for local Club Atlético Lanús in the 1997–98 season, aged only 20. He was subsequently signed as a promising young talent by Sporting CP, but failed to adjust overall and, after two loans to his former club, left in early 2000 amidst accusations of discrimination.

From 2001 to late 2006, Kmet appeared for several teams in his country's top flight. After that, he signed with Club Ferro Carril Oeste of the Primera B Nacional, retiring at 31 after a few months in Cyprus with APOP Kinyras FC.

References

External links
Argentine League statistics  

1977 births
Living people
Argentine people of Ukrainian descent
Sportspeople from Lanús
Argentine footballers
Association football midfielders
Argentine Primera División players
Primera Nacional players
Club Atlético Lanús footballers
Nueva Chicago footballers
Estudiantes de La Plata footballers
Newell's Old Boys footballers
Club de Gimnasia y Esgrima La Plata footballers
Argentinos Juniors footballers
Gimnasia y Esgrima de Jujuy footballers
Ferro Carril Oeste footballers
Primeira Liga players
Sporting CP footballers
Cypriot First Division players
APOP Kinyras FC players
Argentine expatriate footballers
Expatriate footballers in Portugal
Expatriate footballers in Cyprus
Argentine expatriate sportspeople in Portugal
Argentine expatriate sportspeople in Cyprus